Trimurti Films Pvt. Ltd. is an Indian film production house founded by Gulshan Rai in 1970. After Rai's death, his son Rajiv Rai took over as the head of the company. The company's first production was Johny Mera Naam (1970). The company subsequently produced notable films like Deewaar, Trishul, Vidhaata, Tridev, Vishwatma, Mohra and Gupt.

Dormant for more than a decade, the company's last productions was Asambhav (2004). The banner has been re-launched in 2022 by Rajiv Rai who is back with direction after 18 years with Zora & Zora Zoravar.

Films produced by Trimurti Films

External links
Trimurti Films at IMDB

 
Film production companies based in Mumbai
Entertainment companies established in 1970
Mass media companies established in 1970
Indian companies established in 1970
1970 establishments in Maharashtra